Máncora is a town and beach resort in the Piura Region, in northwestern Peru. It is located in the Talara Province and is capital of the Máncora District. The town has 10,547 inhabitants (2007).

The Pan-American Highway serves as Máncora's main street. The area is known for its turquoise beaches and good waves, making it a surfing destination. The beach town has over 30 different beach resorts that receive tourists from all over South America. In 2005, 340,000 tourists visited Mancora.

Climate

Máncora has a warm climate with an average of 29 °C. The hot months, which are from December to May, are characterized by light rains at night and a temperature that can easily reach 35 °C. With the occurrence of El Niño phenomenon , it can go up to 40 °C. In the rest of the year, the daytime temperature rarely drops below 25 or 26 °C, although in winters; from June to September, the nights are cool, windy and the minimum temperature drops to 19 °C. Spring (October and November) and autumn (May and June) maintain temperatures ranging between 20 °C and 30 °C respectively.

The sea temperature in Piura and Tumbes varies. The temperature ranges from 24 °C to 26 °C during the summer months (from December to May) and the rest of the year between 21 °C to 23 °C; something that differentiates it from the rest of Peruvian beaches further south of these regions, since these rarely rise above 22 °C, even in summer. This is due to the significant influence of the Humboldt current.

Sports
Máncora's bay attracts surfers and kite surfers.

Health 
In health, it has a health center at Minsa and the Consultorio Médico Flores, Avenida Grau 184, 999455314, which has been operating since January 1990 and is a graduate of the UNMSM in Lima.

Gallery

See also
Iperu, tourist information and assistance
Tourism in Peru

References

Talara Government description of Mancora
Piura regional government site

External links
http://www.takeoffperu.com/2020/06/18/aerodromo-walter-braedt-segu-un-inmejorable-acceso-al-norte-del-peru/

Populated places in the Piura Region
Surfing locations
Surfing locations in Peru
Beaches of Peru
Tourist attractions in Piura Region